Olearia incondita is a species of flowering plant in the family Asteraceae and is endemic to the south-west of Western Australia. It is a straggly shrub with narrowly elliptic leaves and white or pink and yellow, daisy-like inflorescences.

Description
The surface of the leaves is pimply, the upper surface glabrous and the lower surface with scattered woolly hairs. Flowering occurs from January to April and the fruit is a slightly flattened, pale brown achene, the pappus with 74–102 bristles.

Taxonomy
Olearia incondita was first formally described in 1990 by Nicholas Sèan Lander in the journal Nuytsia from specimens collected by Alison Marjorie Ashby, near Morawa in 1969. The specific epithet (incondita) means "unkempt", referring to the appearance of the plant.

Distribution and habitat
Olearia incondita grows near dry lakes and around granite outcrops in the Avon Wheatbelt, Mallee and Yalgoo  biogeographic regions of south-western Western Australia.

Conservation status
This daisy bush is listed as "not threatened" by the Department of Biodiversity, Conservation and Attractions.

References

humilis
Flora of Western Australia
Plants described in 1990